Miaenia grammica is a species of beetle in the family Cerambycidae. It was described by Pascoe in 1864.

References

Miaenia
Beetles described in 1864